"There Goes the Groom" is the 1997 Christmas special of the BBC sitcom Last of the Summer Wine first shown on 28 December 1997. It was the first to feature Frank Thornton as new third man leader Herbert "Truly of the Yard" Truelove. The episode also marked the final appearance of Foggy. The trio in this episode consisted of: Compo (Bill Owen), Clegg (Peter Sallis) and Truly (Frank Thornton).

Synopsis
Compo and Clegg are off to a stag night where they encounter Herbert Truelove ("Truly of the Yard"), an old school friend, who has retired from the police force. The men, including the groom Ronnie, Barry and Foggy have had too much to drink and Truly rings Wesley for a lift.

At Clegg's house, Truly recalls his married life to "The Former Mrs Truelove". The picture being far from rosy puts Ronnie off getting married. The next morning Barry & Ronnie, still suffering from bad hangovers, help Compo, Clegg and Truly by carrying Foggy into the back of Wesley Pegden's Land Rover still feeling worse for wear from the stag night. They drop off Barry at his and Glenda's house before dropping off Ronnie to get ready for the wedding. But the groom gets frightened when Truly begins his stories of marriage again and does a bunk on a milk float. Foggy, meanwhile, is taken in by the post lady who offers to look after him. Smiler can't work out what to buy for a wedding present and ends up with a vase from Auntie Wainwright's - which he promptly gets his hand stuck in.

Compo, Clegg and Truly eventually catch up with Ronnie, who's chained himself to a road sign in the hills. They carry him and the sign into Wesley's Land Rover but are stopped by the police for stealing the sign. Barry's in a panic because he can't find the wedding ring. He remembers giving it to Foggy but he's disappeared. A neighbour tells him the post lady took Foggy away in her car. Collecting Ronnie from the police station, Truly handcuffs Ronnie to himself and they go to Compo's house to show him what a bachelor pad looks like in the hope it will encourage him to get married; Ronnie rather likes it!

Next they enlist the help of Marina, who poses as a gypsy and warns Ronnie of the bad life he'll have if he doesn't get married. He finally succumbs. As the ceremony is about to begin, Clegg receives a phone call from Foggy saying he is in Blackpool and that he has remembered the ring and has proposed to the post lady.

Trivia
Originally Truly was meant to be a stand in character for Brian Wilde's character of Foggy Dewhurst as, just before filming began on the 1997 Christmas special, Wilde suffered from a mild infection in his leg which he said he knew would stop him from taking part and recommended Frank Thornton to be the new third man leader. But owing to a scheduling problem at the BBC, this meant Wilde (who was by then fully fit), was unable to take part and Thornton ended up becoming Wilde's permanent replacement, as well as doing all the episodes of the 19th series.
While Foggy appears in this episode, his face isn't shown and a body double (Colin Harris) was used in far away shots where he is seen being carried out of the stag night celebration and being put into the back of Wesley Pegden's Land Rover to conceal Brian Wilde's absence from the show.
Former British Olympic medalist athlete and long-term Summer Wine fan Kriss Akabusi makes a guest appearance as a disgruntled milkman.
Thora Hird's real-life daughter, Janette Scott, made a cameo in this episode.

References
30 years of Last of The Summer Wine by Morris Bright & Robert Ross

External links
 

1997 British television episodes
Last of the Summer Wine
British Christmas television episodes